Philip Perkis (born 1935) is an American photographer and educator. He has received a Guggenheim Fellowship and his work is held in the collections of the Art Institute of Chicago, Carnegie Museum of Art, J. Paul Getty Museum, Metropolitan Museum of Art, Museum of Contemporary Art, Los Angeles, and Museum of Fine Arts, Boston.

Life and work
Perkis was born in Boston, Massachusetts. He studied painting at San Francisco Art Institute.

He took up photography while in the Air Force in 1957. Later he made half his living doing commercial assignments and printing for other photographers, and the other half teaching—at Pratt Institute in Brooklyn, New York and at the School of Visual Arts in New York City.

Around 1992, Perkis made photographs in Mexico on a Guggenheim Fellowship, resulting in the 2019 book Mexico.

Personal life
Perkis is married to the artist Cyrilla Mozenter.

Publications

Books of photography by Perkis
Warwick Mountain Series: Photographs. Atlanta, GA: Nexus, 1978. .
The Sadness of Men. New York City: Quantuck Lane, 2008. . With a foreword by Alan Klotz, an introduction by Max Kozloff and a transcrpt of an interview between Perkis and John Braverman Levine.
In a Box Upon the Sea = 바다로 떠나는 상자 속에서 = Pada ro ttŏnanŭn sangja sok esŏ. Seoul, South Korea: Anmoc, 2016. Photographs and anecdotes by Perkis. In English and Korean.
Mexico. Seoul, South Korea: Anmoc, 2019. . In English and Korean.

Other books by Perkis
Teaching Photography: Notes Assembled. Rochester, NY: OB; RIT Cary Graphic Arts. 2001, ; 2005, .
A Single Photography, Twenty Days, Twenty Comments. . With an introduction by Owen Butler.

Films
Just to See – A Mystery: a Film Portrait of Philip Perkis (2015) – 1 h 20 m; documentary directed by Jin Ju Lee

Exhibitions

Solo exhibitions
Philip Perkis: Fifty Years of Photographs, Jepson Center for the Arts, Savannah, Georgia, 2010

Group exhibitions
Spirit of Mexico: Photographs by Bravo, Levitt and Perkis, Telfair Academy, Savannah, Georgia, 2006. With work by Perkins, Manuel Alvarez Bravo and Helen Levitt.

Awards
1991: Guggenheim Fellowship from the John Simon Guggenheim Memorial Foundation for photography

Collections
Perkis' work is held in the following permanent collections:
Art Institute of Chicago: 8 prints (as of 27 October 2022)
Carnegie Museum of Art: 6 prints (as of 27 October 2022)
J. Paul Getty Museum: 2 prints (as of 27 October 2022)
Metropolitan Museum of Art: 8 prints (as of 27 October 2022)
Museum of Contemporary Art, Los Angeles: 4 prints (as of 27 October 2022)
Museum of Fine Arts, Boston: 5 prints (as of 27 October 2022)

References

American photographers
21st-century American photographers
20th-century American photographers
School of Visual Arts faculty
Pratt Institute faculty
San Francisco Art Institute alumni
People from Boston
Living people
1935 births